Admiral Edward Ratala is a South African Naval officer.

He commanded Naval Base Durban till December 2003 before being promoted to flag rank and appointed Director Joint Operations Plans at the Joint Operations Division

He was appointed Director Naval Transformation in 2009 and became Inspector General of the Navy on 1 November 2010.

He retired in February 2014.

References

South African admirals
Living people
Year of birth missing (living people)